Luis Sáenz de la Calzada (1912–1994) was a Spanish painter, poet and actor.

1912 births
1994 deaths
People from León, Spain
20th-century Spanish poets
20th-century Spanish male writers